Yehupetz is a fictional town in the Russian Empire, a portrayal of Kiev in Sholem Aleichem stories. It is a transitional place between the classical shtetl and a modern city.

Name
It is suggested the reason for the selection of the name lies in the experiences of the writer, in reference to the Jewish slavery in Egypt. Victoria Khiterer draws another parallel: "Just as the Hebrews had suffered in Egypt under the pharaohs, so Kiev Jews suffered under their local "pharaohs", as policemen were called in Russian slang". While Kiev was geographically within the Pale of settlement, tsar Nicholas I expelled the Jews from Kiev end excluded the city from the Pale in 1835. Therefore, living in Kiev was illegal for Jews, but they were drawn to the city due to the poverty in the Pale, and "pharaohs" worked hard to catch and expel the illegals. Jewish immigration to the city of Orthodox faith contributed to the growing antisemitism, up to pogroms in the city.

The nickname "Yehupetz" was widely used by the Jewish population of Kiev. The is a literary almanac ) published in Kiev since 1995.

The actual name "Kiev" was used only in one Sholem Aleichem's work: in his 1916 autobiographical novel פונעם יאריד (Funem yarid, translated as From the Fair).

Portrayal
The city features in many stories of the writer, including those about Tevye the Dairyman and Menahem-Mendl and about the shtetl of Kasrilevka.

Tevye lived in a village of Boyberik (renamed to Anatevka in Fiddler on the Roof), a suburb of Yehupetz, and most of his customers lived in Yehupetz. And Tevye in his tales speaks of people of Yehupetz always with the epithet "rich": "rich folks from Yehupetz", "rich man from Yehupetz", etc. 
Every summer all the rich folks from Yehupetz go to their dachas in Boiberik. And these Yehupetz folks are all very refined people who are used to having everything served up to them—wood for the fire, meat and eggs, chickens and onions, peppers and radishes. Why shouldn’t someone make it his business to bring to their doorstep every morning milk, cheese, butter, and sour cream? And as the Yehupetzers like to eat well and don’t give a fig about money, you can charge high prices. (From The Great Windfall)

From the story "The Roof Falls In" (also translated as "Tevye Blows A Small Fortune" or "The Bubble Bursts") we learn that Tevye and Menahem-Mendl first meet in Yehupetz, where Menahem-Mendl had already been lived illegally of a year and a half, and they chatted about Menahem-Mendl's financial dealings, "how one day he's rich and the next a pauper"  (which are detailed in Chapter II: "Papers: The Yehupetz stock exchange" of  The Adventures of Mehahem-Mendl). Menahem-Mendl tries to convince Tevye to join his speculations arguing that Yehupetz is a city of opportunities: "There are in Yehupetz those who were not too long ago going around without shoes, were nobodies, servants, porters. Today they have their own houses made of stone surrounded by high walls. Their wives complain about their indigestion and go abroad for a cure, while they ride around Yehupetz on rubber wheels and pretend not to know anyone!"

In the 1907 story "Sprintze" we learn that a great misfortune befallen on all there rich folks of Yehupetz and they all rushed out: "God wanted to do something for His Jews, and so a misfortune befell us, a disaster, a constitutzia! Ay, a constitutzia ! Suddenly our rich people panicked and stampeded out of Yehupetz, heading abroad, supposedly to the spas to take the waters, to the mineral baths to calm their nerves—pure nonsense." Here "constitutzia" refers to tsar's October Manifesto an which the first Russian Constitution was promised, and which was followed by the 1905 Kiev pogrom (and other pogroms all over the Russian Empire).

Antoni Bortnowski remarks that Yehupetz was not the only portrayal of Kiev by Sholem Aleichem. A very unpleasant image of an unnamed town was given in the novel The Bloody Hoax, but numerous hints, such as "a large glorious city where a Jew needs a residence permit", point at Kiev.

See also
Kasrilevka, a fictional shtetl invented by Sholem Aleichem

References

Further reading
Gennady Estraikh, "From Yehupets Jargonists to Kiev Modernists: The Rise of a Yiddish Literary Centre, 1880s–1914", East European Jewish Affairs 30:1 (2000)

Fictional populated places in Russia
Sholem Aleichem